Harstad Travpark is a harness racing track located at Langmoan in Harstad, Norway. Owned by Norwegian Trotting Association, its tote betting is handled by Norsk Rikstoto. The venue opened in 1995.

References

External links
 Official website

Sports venues in Troms og Finnmark
Harness racing venues in Norway
Sports venues completed in 1995
1995 establishments in Norway
Harstad